The T206 Ty Cobb baseball card depicts the Detroit Tigers' Ty Cobb, one of the inaugural inductees in the Baseball Hall of Fame. The card was designed and issued by the American Tobacco Company (ATC) from 1909 to 1911 as part of its T206 series. The card is even more rare than the T206 Honus Wagner which also had a limited production.

Description 
The card's obverse features a portrait of Cobb surrounded surrounded by a white border. The more common version has the portrait on a red background although there is a more rare green background version. Different versions of the card have advertisements for different tobacco brands. The reverse of cards which advertise Cobb's own brand has green print lettering which reads: ""TY COBB — KING OF THE SMOKING TOBACCO WORLD."

Notable examples

Lucky 7 
In 2016, a cache of 7 T206 Ty Cobb baseball cards were discovered in a paper bag, when a family was cleaning out their deceased great-grandfather's home. These cards were nicknamed the "Lucky 7" and brought the total number of known T206 Ty Cobb's in existence to 22. The cards were authenticated and initially valued at around $1 million. They later sold for $3 million in 2016.

Weisenberg cards 
In August 2022, Jeff Weisenberg purchased a collection of 1,000 T206 cards which included 16 Ty Cobbs. Among these were the only known examples of Cobbs with an ad for Carolina Brights cigarettes on the back.

References 

Baseball cards
Trading cards
Ty Cobb
Baseball memorabilia